The Rwanda women's national cricket team is the team that represents Rwanda in international women's cricket.

History
Rwanda's women's team first played in 2007, playing two matches against Uganda in December of that year, before participating in the 2008–09 East African Women's Championship. Since 2014 the country has hosted the Kwibuka T20 Tournament annually.

In March 2018, Cricket Builds Hope - a charity focused on the use the sport as a tool for social change in Rwanda - commenced the Women's Empowerment Programme, a multi-year project aiming to use cricket to help develop leadership skills amongst women from low-income families in Kigali.

In April 2018, the International Cricket Council (ICC) granted full Women's Twenty20 International (WT20I) status to all its members. Therefore, all Twenty20 matches played between Rwanda women and other ICC members since 1 July 2018 have been full WT20Is.

On 26 January 2019, Rwanda played their first WT20I against Nigeria, which was first WT20I for Nigeria as well. This was the first match of was a 5-match WT20I series between the two countries which Nigeria won 3–2.

In the 2019 ICC Development Awards, recognising advancement of the sport in Associate and Affiliate nations, Rwanda received two of the six awards available: Female Participation Programme of the Year, and Associate Member Women's Performance of the Year.

In December 2020, the ICC announced the qualification pathway for the 2023 ICC Women's T20 World Cup. Rwanda were named in the 2021 ICC Women's T20 World Cup Africa Qualifier regional group, alongside ten other teams. Rwanda finished third in their group after winning three of their five matches, failing to progress to the knockout stages of the tournament.

Records and statistics

International Match Summary — Rwanda Women
 
Last updated 18 June 2022

Twenty20 International 

 Highest team total: 246/1 v Mali, 21 June 2019, at Gahanga International Cricket Stadium.
 Highest individual score: 114*, Marie Bimenyimana v Mali, 21 June 2019, at Gahanga International Cricket Stadium, Kigali and Gisele Ishimwe v Eswatini, 12 September 2021, at Botswana Cricket Association Oval, Gaborone.
 Best individual bowling figures: 4/0, Margueritte Vumiliya v Eswatini, 12 September 2021, at Botswana Cricket Association Oval, Gaborone.

Most T20I runs for Rwanda Women

Most T20I wickets for Rwanda Women

Records complete to WT20I #1131. Last updated 18 June 2022.

Current squad

Updated September 2021

See also
 List of Rwanda women Twenty20 International cricketers

References

Further reading

 

Women's
Women's national cricket teams
Cricket